This is a list of hillside letters (also known as mountain monograms) in the U.S. state of Montana. There are at least 86 hillside letters, acronyms, and messages in the state, possibly as many as 90. While western Montana provides plenty of mountains to support these monograms, many towns in the eastern prairie have also placed them on whatever hill they can find.

Sources

External links

 Mountain Monograms, a website explaining the origins and with an incomplete list and pictures
 Hillside Letters, a companion website to a book on the subject
 Letters on Hills, a category on waymarking.com for geocachers
 Modern Geoglyphs, a compilation of geoglyphs in Montana with photos and maps

Geoglyphs
Montana
Lists of public art in the United States